The London and North Eastern Railway (LNER) Peppercorn Class A2 is a class of steam locomotive designed for express passenger work by Arthur Peppercorn, the chief designer of the LNER after Edward Thompson.  All save the first of the 15 built were constructed under British Railways after nationalisation in 1948.

Construction 

The first of the Peppercorn A2s, No. 525 A.H.Peppercorn, was outshopped from Doncaster in December 1947 on the eve of nationalisation, and named after the designer of the class, Arthur Peppercorn. The modernity of the design was immediately apparent. The first two of the class were turned out in LNER apple green livery, and this colour was also applied to the next 13 engines delivered between January and August 1948. Repainting in British Railways Brunswick green began the following year. Another 20 members of the class were also planned, but were cancelled on 4 May 1948.

The design was a move towards modernity, with features such as a self-cleaning smoke-box and electric lighting. Initially the Self Cleaning apparatus caused steaming troubles when combined with a single chimney, but changes to the draughting, notably the inclusion of a Double Kylchap Blastpipe brought about the free steaming capability along with the convenience of less frequent smoke-box cleaning. Some A2's retained their single chimneys, though the Double Blastpipe did bring about notable free running on the A2's to which it was fitted, as well as an improvement in fuel economy.

The class's 50 sq ft grate, a remnant of the P2 lineage (from both Thompson and Peppercorn) boilers, meant the A2's were capable of high power and endurance; however, with the exception of the Aberdeen road, there was little need for this large grate firebox in the postwar era, and as a result, on comparable duties the A2's were heavier on fuel than the Gresley machines which pre-dated them, but for outright power and haulage capability, they were the logical successor to the P2 class, and finally provided the answer the Edinburgh-Aberdeen route required. As a result, they were amongst the last multi-cylindered express steam locomotive classes to remain in service in the UK.

Stock list 
Only No. 525 was technically built during LNER ownership, but 526-31 received LNER 1946 numbers. From 60532 onwards, the A2s received BR numbers from new, BR numbers being the LNER 1946 numbers with the addition of 60000. With the exception of No. 525, named after the last Chief Mechanical Engineer of the LNER, they were named after racehorses.

Service 
Initially, the A2s were based at depots the length of the East Coast Main Line, ranging from New England (Peterborough) in the south to Edinburgh's Haymarket. In 1949, five were put to work on the Edinburgh-Dundee-Aberdeen route and proved the ideal engines for its stiff gradients and sharp curvature. The A2s also worked to Perth, Glasgow, Carlisle, Newcastle upon Tyne and occasionally more southerly outposts. In 1963, Nos. 60525, 60530, and 60535 crossed the LNER-LMS divide and were allocated to a Glasgow depot, Polmadie. They replaced ex-LMS Coronation Class over the ex-Caledonian Railway route to Carlisle.

The final years of the A2s came in eastern Scotland with many notable performances over the Aberdeen road during the early 1960s. In 1961 on Stoke bank in Lincolnshire, the location of Mallard's 1938 world speed record, No. 60526 Sugar Palm achieved . Withdrawals began in the following year. Neither 60526 Sugar Palm or No. 60525 A. H. Peppercorn were saved for preservation.

Withdrawal 

Withdrawal occurred between 1962 and 1966.  The last three engines - 60528 Tudor Minstrel, 60530 Sayajirao and 60532 Blue Peter - were retired in June 1966.

Preservation

One Peppercorn A2, 60532 Blue Peter, has survived.

References

External links 

 The Peppercorn A2 Pacifics LNER encyclopedia
 The North Eastern Locomotive Preservation Group

A2 Peppercorn
LNER A2 Peppercorn
Railway locomotives introduced in 1947
Standard gauge steam locomotives of Great Britain
2′C1′ h3 locomotives
Passenger locomotives